Roger Frank Jackson (born 5 January 1939) is an English former first-class cricketer.

Jackson was born at Woolwich in January 1939. He later studied at Hertford College, Oxford where he played first-class cricket for Oxford University in 1962, making two appearances at Oxford against Gloucestershire and Yorkshire. Playing as a right-arm fast bowler, he bowled a total of 29 overs across his two matches, but failed to take a wicket.

References

External links

1939 births
Living people
People from Woolwich
Alumni of Hertford College, Oxford
English cricketers
Oxford University cricketers